Racławice  is a village in the administrative district of Gmina Jerzmanowice-Przeginia, within Kraków County, Lesser Poland Voivodeship, in southern Poland.
Religions: Roman Catholicism (The Church), Jehovah's Witnesses (1%).

References

Villages in Kraków County